The canton of Écommoy is an administrative division of the Sarthe department, northwestern France. Its borders were modified at the French canton reorganisation which came into effect in March 2015. Its seat is in Écommoy.

It consists of the following communes:
 
Écommoy
Laigné-en-Belin
Marigné-Laillé
Moncé-en-Belin
Mulsanne
Ruaudin
Saint-Biez-en-Belin
Saint-Gervais-en-Belin
Saint-Ouen-en-Belin
Teloché

References

Cantons of Sarthe